The canton of Mutzig is an administrative division of the Bas-Rhin department, northeastern France. It was created at the French canton reorganisation which came into effect in March 2015. Its seat is in Mutzig.

It consists of the following communes:

Albé
Barembach
Bassemberg
Bellefosse
Belmont
Blancherupt
Bourg-Bruche
Breitenau
Breitenbach
La Broque
Colroy-la-Roche
Dieffenbach-au-Val
Dinsheim-sur-Bruche
Fouchy
Fouday
Grandfontaine
Gresswiller
Heiligenberg
Lalaye
Lutzelhouse
Maisonsgoutte
Muhlbach-sur-Bruche
Mutzig
Natzwiller
Neubois
Neuve-Église
Neuviller-la-Roche
Niederhaslach
Oberhaslach
Plaine
Ranrupt
Rothau
Russ
Saales
Saint-Blaise-la-Roche
Saint-Martin
Saint-Maurice
Saint-Pierre-Bois
Saulxures
Schirmeck
Solbach
Steige
Still
Thanvillé
Triembach-au-Val
Urbeis
Urmatt
Villé
Waldersbach
Wildersbach
Wisches

References

Cantons of Bas-Rhin